Student Rugby could refer to more than one topic.

In rugby league

 Student Rugby League, the organisation which administrates university and college rugby league in the United Kingdom, on behalf of the Rugby Football League and BUCS.

In rugby union see

 Student rugby union